, Namibia has 1,947 primary and secondary schools, up from 1,723 schools in 2013. These schools cater for a total of 822,574 pupils (2013: 24,660 teachers, 617,827 pupils). Most of the country experiences a shortage of schools, school hostels, and classroom space.

Many Namibian schools are built in a uniform design that was suggested by the Chilean-born (turned Swedish citizen) architect Gabriel Castro,  in the 1990s.

Primary and secondary schools
The Government of Namibia keeps a list of all registered private and government schools in the country.

A–C

 A. Shipena Secondary School, Katutura, Windhoek, Khomas Region
 A. A. Denk Memorial School, Kalkrand, Hardap Region
 Acacia High School, Windhoek
 Academia Secondary School, Khomasdal, Windhoek, Khomas Region
 All Nations Christian Primary School, Windhoek, Khomas Region
 Amakali Combined School, Amuteye, Onyaanya Constituency, Oshikoto Region
 Amazing Kids Private School, Windhoek, Khomas Region
 Ambunda Primary School, Oniiwe B, Oshikoto Region
 Amen Combined School, Onihadhila, Oshikoto Region
 Andimba Toivo ya Toivo Senior Secondary School (formerly: Oluno Senior Secondary School), Ondangwa, Oshana Region
 Angra Pequena Senior Secondary School, Lüderitz, ǁKaras Region
 Anna Maasdorp Primary School, Duineveld, Hardap Region
 Arandis Primary School, Erongo Region
 Ashipala Junior Secondary School, Onatshiku, Omusati Region
 Atlantic Junior Secondary School, Swakopmund, Erongo Region
 Andreas Haingura Kandjimi Primary School, Rundu, Kavango East
 Auas Primary School, Katutura, Windhoek, Khomas Region
 Augustineum Secondary School, Khomasdal, Windhoek, Khomas Region (until 1890: Otjimbingwe, Erongo Region until 1968: Okahandja, Otjozondjupa Region)
 Bet-El Primary School, Katutura, Windhoek, Khomas Region
 Blouberg Primary School, Kalahari Constituency, Omaheke Region
 Bloukrans Primary School, Dordabis, Khomas Region
 Bukalo Primary School, Katima Mulilo, Zambezi Region
 Bunya Combined School, Bunya, Kavango West
 Brandberg Primary School, Uis.  the school had 279 pupils.
 Braunfels Agricultural High School, Outjo Constituency, Kunene Region
 C. Spellmeyer Junior Secondary School (founded 1944, closed 2008)
 Cabatana Private School, Oshakati, Oshana Region
 Canisianum Roman Catholic High School, Anamulenge, Omusati Region, established as a Catholic school, first provisionally at Okatana in 1971, and moved to Outapi in 1972. Closed in 1977 due to the Namibian War of Independence and taken over by the Namibian government at Independence of Namibia, housing a junior secondary school. Returned to the Catholic Church in 2003, and reopened as a private school in 2004. It was the fourth-best school in the country in 2013 and 2014
 Caprivi Senior Secondary School, Katima Mulilo, Zambezi Region
 Centaurus Secondary School, Windhoek, Khomas Region
 Charles Anderson Combined School, Ongwediva, Oshana Region
 Chief Hosea Kutako Primary School, Aminuis, Omaheke Region
 Chinchimane Combined School, Zambezi Region
 C. J. Brandt Secondary School, Katutura, Windhoek, Khomas Region
 Combretum Trust School, Windhoek, Khomas Region
 Concordia College, Windhoek, Khomas Region
 Constantia Private Combined School, Windhoek, Khomas Region
 Cornelius Goreseb Senior Secondary School, Khorixas, Kunene Region
 Cosmos High School, Windhoek, Khomas Region

D

 Da-Palm Senior Secondary School, Otjimbingwe, Erongo Region
 Dagbreek Centre, Windhoek, Khomas Region, established 1970, a school for the handicapped
 Danie Joubert Combined School, Mariental, Hardap Region
 Daweb Junior Secondary School, Maltahöhe, Hardap Region
 Daweb Primary School, Maltahöhe, Hardap Region
 Dawid Bezuidenhout High School, Windhoek, Khomas Region
 David Sheehama Senior Secondary School, Outapi, Omusati Region
 De Duine Secondary School, Walvis Bay, Erongo Region
 Delta Primary School Windhoek (DSW), Windhoek, Khomas Region
 Delta Secondary School Windhoek (DSSW), Windhoek, Khomas Region
 Deutsche Höhere Privatschule Windhoek (DHPS), Windhoek, Khomas Region
 Diaz Primary School, Lüderitz, ǁKaras Region
 Dibasen Junior Secondary School, Okombahe, Erongo Region
 Divundu Combined School, Divundu, Kavango East Region
 Don Bosco Primary School, Keetmanshoop, ǁKaras Region
 Donatus Secondary School, Otjiwarongo, Otjozondjupa Region
 Donkerbos Primary School, Donkerbos, Omaheke Region
 Dordabis Primary School, Dordabis, Khomas Region
 Dr Abraham Iyambo Senior Secondary School, before 2014 named Oshikunde Senior Secondary School, Oshikunde, Ohangwena Region
 Duinesig Combined School, Walvis Bay, Erongo Region
 Duneside Private High School, Walvis Bay, Erongo Region

E–G

 Edward ǀGaroëb Primary School, Anker, Kunene Region
 Ebenhaeser Primary School, Karibib, Erongo Region
 Eddie Bowe Primary School, Khorixas, Kunene Region
 Edundja Junior Secondary School, Edundja, Ohangwena Region
 Eemboo Combined School, Eemboo, Ohangwena Region
 Eengendjo Senior Secondary School, Omungwelume, Ohangwena Region
 Eengwena Primary School, Eenagwena, Omusati Region
 Eenhana Secondary School, Eenhana, Ohangwena Region
 Benjamin Hauwanga Combined School, Eenkalashe, Omusati Region
 Ehomba Combined School, Ehomba, Kunene Region
 Ekulo Senior Secondary School, near Omuthiya, Oshikoto Region
 Elakalapwa Combined School, Oikoto, Ohangwena Region
 Elamba Combined School, Tsandi, Omusati Region
 Elao Primary School, Okanghudi, Ohangwena Region
 ELCIN Nkurenkuru High School, Nkurenkuru, Kavango West
 Ella du Plessis High School, Windhoek, Khomas Region
 Elondo East Primary School, Tsandi, Omusati Region
 Eloolo Combined School, Eloolo, Oshana Region
 Emma Hoogenhout Primary School, Windhoek, established 1900
 Empelheim Junior Secondary School, Mariental
 Eendombe Combined School, Eendombe, Omusati Region
 Engombe Junior Primary School, Engombe, Oshana Region; established in 1996 by the community and corporate sponsors; since the building's roof blew off in 2013, instruction is given in tents
 Epako Junior Secondary School, Gobabis
 Epandulo Combined School, Onalunike, Oshikoto Region
 Epukiro Post 3 Junior Secondary School, Epukiro, Omaheke Region
 Epukiro Roman Catholic Primary School, Epukiro, Omaheke Region
 Erkki Tauya Junior Secondary School (formerly Nakayale Combined School), Nakayale, Omusati Region
 Eros Primary School, Windhoek, Khomas Region
 Eros School for Girls, a school for girls with learning difficulties, Windhoek, Khomas Region
 Erundu Combined School, Oshakati, Oshana Region
 Esheshete Combined School, Esheshete, Oshikoto Region
 Etalaleko Senior Secondary School, Okahao, Omusati Region
 Etanga Primary School, Etanga, Kunene Region
 Etosha Secondary School, Tsumeb, Oshikoto Region
 Etsapa Combined School, Etsapa, Ohangwena Region
 Dr Frans Aupa Indongo Primary School, Windhoek, Khomas Region
 Frans Frederick Combined School, Fransfontein, Kunene Region
 Friedrich Awaseb Senior Secondary School, Grootfontein, Otjozondjupa Region
 Gabriel Taapopi Senior Secondary School, Ongwediva, Oshana Region
 Gam Primary School, Grootfontein, Otjozondjupa Region
 Gam Secondary School, Gam, Otjozondjupa Region
 Gammams Primary School, Windhoek
 Gobabis Gymnasium Private School, Omaheke Region; was the third-best school in the country in 2014 (2013: rank 6)
 G. K. Wahl Combined School, Kalkfeld, Otjozondjupa Region
 Gobabis Primary School, Gobabis, Omaheke Region
 Goreangab Junior Secondary School, Windhoek, Khomas Region
 Gqaina Primary School, Okarukambe Constituency, Omaheke Region
 Groot Aub Junior Seconday School, Khomas Region
 Grootberg Primary School, Erwee, Kunene Region
 Grootfontein Agricultural College (GAC), Grootfontein, Otjozondjupa Region
 Grootfontein Secondary School, Grootfontein, Otjozondjupa Region
 Gustav Kandjii Junior Secondary School, Otjinene, Omaheke Region

H–K

 Hage G. Geingob High School, Windhoek, Khomas Region
 Haimbili Haufiku Senior Secondary School, near Eenhana, Ohangwena Region
 Haisisira Junior Primary School, Kavango West
 Hans Daniel Namuhuya Senior Secondary School, Ondando, Oshikoto Region
 Himarwa Ithete Secondary School, Mpungu, Kavango West
 Haudano Secondary School (formerly called Okalongo Senior Secondary School), Okalongo, Omusati Region
 Hedimbi Primary School, Eengodi Constituency, Oshikoto Region; established 1992; 154 pupils in 2013
 Helene Van Rhijn Primary School, Lüderitz, ǁKaras Region
 Heroes Private School, Oshigambo, Oshikoto Region
 Windhoek Technical High School, Khomas Region
 Highlands Christian School, private school in Windhoek, Khomas Region
 Highline Secondary School, Greenwell Matongo, Windhoek
 Hoachanas A.M.E. Community Private Primary School, Hardap Region
 Hochland High School, Windhoek, Khomas Region
 Holy Cross Convent School, Windhoek, Khomas Region; established 1906
 Hoeksteen Primary School, Rosh Pinah, ǁKaras Region
 Immanuel Shifidi Secondary School, Windhoek, Khomas Region
 Iihenda Secondary School, Oshitayi, Ondangwa Urban constituency
 Iikelo Combined School, Iikelo, Epembe Constituency
 Iilyateko Combined School, Oshihiindongo, Omusati Region
 Iipumbu Senior Secondary School, Oshakati
 Isak Katali Combined School, Okasheshete, Omusati Region
 Izak Buys Junior Secondary School, Leonardville
 Isize Combined School, Katima Mulilo
 J. G. van der Wath Secondary School, Okahandja
 Jacob Basson Combined School, Bergsig, Kunene Region
 Jakob Marengo Secondary School, Khomasdal, Windhoek; established 1985 as an alternative, learner-centerer school; named after freedom fighter Jakob Marengo; catered for close to 1,000 learners in grades 10–12; one of few Namibian schools where learners are not required to wear school uniform
 Jan Jonker Afrikaner High School, Katutura, Windhoek, Khomas Region
 Jan Möhr Secondary School, Windhoek, Khomas Region
 John Alphons Pandeni Combined School, Omundjalala, Outapi, Omusati Region
 P.J. Tsaitsaib Combined School, Hoachanas, Hardap Region
 Reverend Juuso Shikongo Senior Secondary School, Onankali, Oshikoto Region
 Kalkfeld Primary School, Kalkfeld, Otjozondjupa
 Kamwandi Combined School, Henties Bay, Erongo Region
 Karibib Junior Secondary School, Erongo Region
 Karibib Primary School, Karibib, Erongo Region
 Karibib Private School, Karibib, Erongo Region
 Kandjimi Murangi Secondary School, Nkurenkuru, Kavango West
 Karuci Primary School, Ndiyona, Kavango East
 Karukuta Primary School, Karukuta, Kavango East
 Karundu Primary School, Otjiwarongo, Otjozondjupa Region
 Kasivi Combined School, Kasivi, Kavango West
 Kauluma Combined School, Ongula, Ohangwena Region
 Keendawala Junior Secondary School, Tsandi, Omusati Region
 Kephas Muzuma Primary School, Otjikavare, Kunene Region
 Khomas High School, Windhoek West
 Klein Aub Special School, Hardap Region
 Klein Aub Primary School, Hardap Region
 Kolin Foundation Secondary School, Arandis
 Kongola Combined School, Kongola, Zambezi Region
 Kuisebmond Secondary School, Walvis Bay, Erongo Region

 Karasburg Primary School karasburg, //karas region

L–N

 Leevi Hakusembe Senior Secondary School, Sizongoro, Kapako Constituency
 Linus Shashipapo Secondary School, Shinyunwe, Rundu Rural
 Linyanti Combined School, Linyanti Constituency, Zambezi Region
 Mangetti Dune Primary School, Tsumkwe Constituency, Otjozondjupa Region. Mangetti Dune is a boarding school that mainly caters for the marginalised San community; its learners come from families that live in extreme poverty. The school had 363 learners and has 14 teachers in 2014, and was the constituency's best performing primary school. The school buildings are part of a converted military base.
 Mariental Primary School, Mariental
 Marmer Primary School, Aus
 Maria Mwengere Secondary School, Kayengona, Rundu Rural
 Martin Luther High School, Okombahe
 Martin Ndumba Combined School, Divundu
 Martti Ahtisaari Primary School, Wanaheda, Windhoek. Established 1991 as Wanaheda Primary School, renamed 1997 after Martti Ahtisaari, head of UNTAG
 Maurits Devenish Private Primary School, Ongwediva
 Mbongolo Primary School, Etapaela, Tsandi Constituency
 Monica Geingos Secondary School, Otjiwarongo
 Moses ǁGaroëb Primary School, Windhoek
 Motsomi Primary School, Corridor 13, Aminuis, Omaheke Region
 Mphe Thuto Primary School, Tsjaka, Omaheke Region
 Mumbwenge Combined School, Ombalamumbwenge, Oshikoto Region
 Mwaala High School, Tsandi
 Mwadikange Kaulinge Secondary School, Ondobe
 Mwadinomho Combined School, Ondeihaluka, Ohangwena Region
 Mweshipandeka High School, Ongwediva
 Nailenge Primary School, Oshali, Endola Constituency
 Nambula Combined School, Elondo East, Tsandi Constituency
 Namib High School (1913–1918: Städtische Realschule mit Grundschule, 1919–1929: Swakopmund Primary School, 1930–1945: Reformrealgymnasium, 1946–1975: Swakopmund High School, 1976–1980: Deutsche Schule Swakopmund, 1981–1997: Deutsche Oberschule Swakopmund), Swakopmund, Erongo Region
 Namibia Primary School, established 1988 as Namibian English Primary School. Katutura, Windhoek, Khomas Region
 Nanghonda Combined School, Ongha, Endola Constituency
 Ndiyona Combined School, Ndiyona, Ndiyona Constituency
 Negumbo Senior Secondary School, Onaanda, Elim Constituency established in 1999
 Nehale Senior Secondary School, Onayena
 Noordgrens Secondary School, Rundu
 Nossob Primary School, Omaheke Region
 Northcote Private School, Oniipa
 Nuuyoma Senior Secondary School, Oshikuku, Omusati Region
 Ntara Combined School, Ntara, Musese Constituency
 Nyangana Combined School, Nyangana, Ndonga Linena Constituency
 Nyondo Combined School, Ndiyona, Ndiyona Constituency

O

 Odibo Combined School, Odibo, Ohangwena Region
 Oikango Combined School, Ohakweenyanga, Ompundja Constituency
 Oipya Primary School, Etameko, Engela Constituency
 Ongenga Junior Seconday School, Ongenga, Ongenga Constituency 
 Ongenga English Private Primary School, Ongenga, Ongenga Constituency
 Onghwiyu Combined School, Onghwiyu, Oshikunde Constituency
 Okaepe Project School. Okaepe, Okakarara Constituency
 Okakarara Senior Secondary School
Established in 1937 by Finnish missionaries. In 2010 the school had 16 teachers and 460 learners, about half of them orphans or otherwise vulnerable children.
 Okathitu Combined School, Okathitu kalyoshandi, Tsandi Constituency
 Okomakwiya Junior Primary School, Okomakwiya, Onesi Constituency
 Okondjatu Combined School, Okondjatu, Okakarara Constituency
 Okaleke Combined School, Elim, Elim Constituency
 Olambo Junior Primary School, Olambo, Onyaanya Constituency
 Olupaka Combined School, Outapi
 Olupale Combined School, Omaakuku, Omuthiyagwiipundi Constituency
 Omakondo Combined School, Omakondo, Omulonga Constituency
 Omaruru Primary School, Omaruru
 Omatjete Primary School, Omaruru
 Ombombo Combined School, Ombombo, Epupa Constituency
 Ombome Combined School, Ombome, Onesi Constituency
 Ombuga Combined School, Ombuga Hamunyoko, Oshakati West
 Ombundu Combined School, Ombundu, Onyaanya Constituency
 Omuhaturua Primary School, Otjimanangombe, Epukiro Constituency
 Omutse Combined School, Omutse, Onyaanya Constituency
 Omuthiya Iipundi Senior Secondary School, Omuthiya
 Omuulukila Primary School, Outapi
 Onaholongo Combined School, Outapi
 Onakalunga Combined School, Onakalunga, Omundaungilo Constituency, Ohangwena Region, established in 1995.
 Onakasino Junior Primary School, Onakasino, Omuthiyagwiipundi Constituency
 Onamukulo Combined School, Onamukulo, Omulonga Constituency
 Onamunhama Combined School, Onamunhama, Ondobe Constituency
 Onamutene Combined School, Onamutene, Onayena Constituency
 Onangolo Secondary School, Onangolo, Epembe Constituency
 Onangholo Combined School, Outapi
 Onankali-North Combined School, Omahenge, Eenhana Constituency
 Onankali-South Combined School, Onankali, Onyaanya Constituency
 Onangwe Combined School, Onangwe, Omulonga Constituency
 Onampadhi Primary School, Onampadhi, Oniipa Constituency
 Onathinge-North Combined School, Onathinge, Oniipa Constituency
 Onathinge-South Combined School, Onathinge, Onayena Constituency
 Onashitendo Primary School, Onashitendo, Tsandi Constituency
 Onesi Senior Secondary School, Onesi, Onesi Constituency
 Ongha Senior Secondary School, Ongha, Endola Constituency
 Ongolo Combined School, Eengolo, Ogongo Constituency
 Onguti Senior Secondary School, Okankolo, Okankolo Constituency
 Oniihwa Combined School, Onayena
 Oniiwe Primary School, Onayena
 Onyika Junior Secondary School, Oshikuku
 Opuwo Primary School, Opuwo.  the school had 39 teachers and 1,200 learners.
 Orange Combined School, Orange, Okalongo Constituency
 Oranjemund Private School
 Orban Primary School, Windhoek
 Orwetoveni Primary School, Otjiwarongo
 Oshakati Senior Secondary School
 Oshali West Combined School, Oshali West, Endola Constituency
 Oshidute Combined School, Oshidute, Epembe Constituency, Ohangwena Region
 Oshigambo High School, Oshigambo
 Oshikulufitu Combined School, Outapi
 Oshilemba Combined School, Oshilemba, Onesi Constituency
 Otjikojo Primary School, Otjikojo, Opuwo Rural. The school was started in 2015 and inaugurated in 2017.  it has 183 learners and 10 staff.
 Otjiwarongo Secondary School, Otjiwarongo
 Oupili Combined School, Oupili, Oshikunde Constituency
 Outjo Secondary School, Outjo

P–S

 P.K. De Villiers Secondary School, Keetmanshoop, ǁKaras Region
 Pahangwashime Combined School, Oipanda, Endola Constituency
 Petrus ǃGaneb Secondary School, Uis. This school offers grades 8 to 12 to  295 learners from grades 8 to 12. The school was built before Namibian independence; its facilities are old and dilapidated.
 Petrus Vries Primary School, Khauxas, Hardap Region
 Pionier Boys' School, Windhoek, Khomas Region
 Pionierspark Primary School, Windhoek, Khomas Region
 Paresis Secondary School, Otjiwarongo
 Primary School Baumgartsbrunn, Khomas Region
 Putuavanga Senior Secondary School, Opuwo
 Rietquelle Junior Secondary School, Rietquelle, part of Aminuis, Omaheke Region
 Rocky Crest Senior Secondary School
 Roman Catholic Mokaleng Combined School, Aminuis, Omaheke Region
 Romanus Kamunoko Senior Secondary School, Rundu
 Rosh Pinah Academy, a secondary school in Rosh Pinah
 Ruacana Vocational Secondary School, Ruacana
 Rucara Combined School, Rucara, Ndiyona Constituency
 Rukongo Vision School, Divundu, Kavango East Region; first vision school of Namibia; established 2013
 Rundu Secondary School (RSS), Kavango Region
 Rupara Combined School, Rupara, Musese Constituency
 Sanjo Senior Secondary School, Bukalo, Zambezi Region
 Schmelenville Combined School, Bethanie
 Shaanika Nashilongo Secondary School, Okahao, Omusati Region
 Shikeva Combined School, Ohangwena
 Shikongo Iipinge Senior Secondary School, Tsandi, Omusati Region
 Sakaria Shikudule Combined School, Oshali, Endola Constituency
 Shitemo Combined School, Ndonga Linena Constituency
 Simataa Secondary School, Chinchimane, Zambezi Region
 Singalamwe Combined School, Singalamwe, Kongola Constituency
 St. Andrews Primary School, primary school in Windhoek's Khomasdal suburb
 St Boniface College (SBC), Kavango Region
 St Barnabas Anglican Church School, part of St Barnabas, Windhoek, destroyed in the 1960s when Windhoek's Old Location was closed for Blacks.
 Saint Charles Lwanga High School, Outapi
 St George's Diocesan College, Windhoek
 St. Joseph's Roman Catholic High School, Döbra, Khomas Region
 St. Mary's Odibo High School, Odibo, Ohangwena Region
 St. Paul's College, Windhoek, Khomas Region
 Suiderhof Primary School
 Swakopmund Christian Academy (SCA), Swakopmund, Erongo Region
 Secondary School Swakopmund (SSS), Swakopmund, Erongo Region

T–Z

 Tanben College, Windhoek West
 The International School of Walvis Bay
 The University Centre for Studies in Namibia (TUCSIN), Windhoek, Khomas Region
 Tobias Hainyeko Project School, Windhoek
 Tsau ǁKhaeb Secondary School, Rosh Pinah
 Tsandi Primary School, Tsandi
 Tsaraxa-Aibes Combined School, Otjiwarongo
 Tsintsabis Combined School, Tsintsabis
 Tsumkwe Primary School, Tsumkwe
 Tsumeb Gimnasium Private School, Tsumeb
 Tulihongeni Combined School, Engela Constituency
 Uukule Senior Secondary School, Onyaanya Constituency, Oshikoto Region
A school predominantly for San people with 12 teachers and more than 300 pupils.
 Uuyoka Combined School, Uuyoka
 Waapandula Primary School, Omuthiya, Oshikoto Region
 Waldorf School Windhoek
 Walvis Bay Private School, Walvis Bay, Erongo Region
 Wennie Du Plessis Secondary School, Gobabis, Omaheke Region
 Willem Borchard Primary School, Okombahe
 Windhoek Afrikaanse Privaatskool
 Windhoek Gymnasium Private School, Windhoek, Khomas Region
 Windhoek High School (WHS)
 Windhoek International School (WIS)

See also

 Education in Namibia
 List of universities in Namibia (includes technical schools)
 List of buildings and structures in Namibia
 Lists of schools

References 

 
 
 
 
 
 
 
 
 
 
 
 
 
 https://web.archive.org/web/20070114052056/http://www.africaalmanac.com/top20highschools.html
 http://www.namibiaproperty.com/info.htm
 http://www.namibia-botschaft.de/html_namibia/bilder/Schulen.pdf
 

Schools
Schools
Namibia
Namibia
Schools